Music from The American Epic Sessions: Original Motion Picture Soundtrack is the official 2017 soundtrack album of the award-winning film The American Epic Sessions. The album features twenty-three music acts recording songs live on the restored first electrical sound recording system from the 1920s. The artists participating include Nas, Alabama Shakes, Elton John, Willie Nelson, Merle Haggard, Jack White, Taj Mahal, Ana Gabriel, Pokey LaFarge, Beck, Ashley Monroe, and Steve Martin. The album won a Grammy Award for Best American Roots Performance for the Alabama Shakes' performance of "Killer Diller".

Background 
The American Epic Sessions film and soundtrack was conceived by director Bernard MacMahon as a practical implementation of the music and technology explored in the first three American Epic films which focused on the first recordings of roots music in the USA in the 1920s. Film producer Allison McGourty explained, "if the first three American Epic films are like the story of the Apollo [first manned moon landing] mission, with unseen film footage, interviews with the astronauts and scientists, then…The American Epic Sessions, is where we rebuild the rocket and go to the moon ourselves." MacMahon added that the idea for The American Epic Sessions film and the soundtrack album was born out of a desire to understand on a practical level how the first electrical recordings in the 1920s were made, "you can only truly appreciate history, and understand why things were done the way they were done, by actually going out and doing them yourself." The soundtrack album involved replicating a 1920s recording session, down to the smallest detail, with twenty-three contemporary music acts recording live on the original 1920s equipment in back to back sessions just as the original rural performers would have done over 80 years ago. The film and soundtrack involved a decade of work restoring the machine, which was pieced together from spare parts scattered across the globe. MacMahon invited Jack White and T Bone Burnett to produce the sessions, and secured the use of Vox studios in Hollywood, purportedly the oldest private recording studio in the world, built in 1936, to film and record the live performances.

Content 
The musicians were encouraged to record both a vintage song and a song they had written. MacMahon and Duke Erikson created a list of vintage songs that they wanted to feature in the film and specifically chose songs for particular performers; "Mal Hombre" for Ana Gabriel, "On the Road Again" for Nas, "Tomi Tomi" for the Hawaiians and "Nobody's Dirty Business" for Bettye LaVette. Other performers researched the period and selected their own vintage songs; Jack White unearthed "Matrimonial Intentions", The Avett Brothers chose "Jordan Am a Hard Road" and Rhiannon Giddens covered Ida Cox's "One Hour Mama". Most of the performers recorded two songs, although the duration of the film precluded all these performances appearing in the finished film. Some performers wrote songs specifically for the film - Merle Haggard composed "The Only Man Wilder Than Me" as a duet for him and Willie Nelson to perform. Elton John arrived at the studio with a lyric entitled "Two Fingers of Whiskey" that Bernie Taupin had written specifically for the film. Elton proceeded to write the melody live on camera and arrange the song with Jack White and recorded the song live direct to disc without leaving the room during the whole process. The soundtrack included twelve additional songs not featured in the film, including "One Mic" by Nas, "Mama's Angel Child" by Jack White, "Come On In My Kitchen" by Stephen Stills, and "Josephine" by Pokey Lafarge.

Recording

Western Electric recording system 
In 1925, Western Electric launched a new electronic recording system. The machine revolutionized the recording of music because it could record every type of instrument and voice whereas the acoustic horn recordings that predated it were severely limited in what they could record effectively. The new system consisted of an electrical microphone whose signal was amplified by a 6' amplifier rack. The amplified signal was then sent to a cutting head that cut a wax disc on a Scully cutting lathe that was pulley powered by a 100Ib brass weight. In the 1920s as radio took over the pop music business, record companies were forced to expand their markets and leave their studios in major cities in search of new musical styles and markets. They organized field recording sessions across America and recorded blues, gospel, Cajun, country, Hawaiian, Native American, and many other hitherto unrecorded types of music. The Western Electric system technologically made these recordings possible. These recordings would go on to have vast cultural impact in North America and the rest of the world. The recording system was leased out to the major record labels who had to pay a royalty, on every record sold, to Western Electric. The success of these music recordings led to the system being leased by the major Hollywood studios for talking pictures after initial resistance. Although there are no records of how many of these machines were leased out to the record companies, estimates range from a dozen to two dozen. Prior to the release of The American Epic Sessions, the recording system was mysterious and had not been seen in almost 80 years. American Epic engineer Nicholas Bergh explained, "I had two mentors when I was getting into audio who started their careers in the late 1930s in America and both of them told me that even by the late '30s this system was basically mythical and they had never seen any components of it or even pictures. So even in ten years it had basically disappeared off the face of the earth."

Restoring the recording system 
At the outset of the pre-production of the American Epic documentary series there were no known photos or film footage of the Western Electric system. Midway through the research on the film, MacMahon was introduced to sound engineer Nicholas Bergh as a possible collaborator. Bergh revealed that he had spent almost a decade attempting to restore the Western Electric system, scavenging spare parts from around the world in places as far away as Japan and Europe in his quest to complete the system. "All the individual items had to come from different places, often thousands of miles apart" he explained, "I was able to confirm my progress by studying the few crude music studio pictures that started to show up." However, Bergh was missing a vital part of the set up – the pulley driven Scully lathe. On an exploratory trip to the Scully family looking for photographs, MacMahon discovered in the family's basement perhaps the only surviving 1924 Scully lathe and persuaded them to loan it to the production. MacMahon then set about persuading Bergh to engineer a session with contemporary artists recording on the system. Bergh was nervous about doing this as "moving that [the recording system] into a production environment, that was a major change." MacMahon persuaded Bergh to participate in a test session with two new artists so as to limit the pressure. Frank Fairfield and The Americans were the first musicians to record on the system in over 80 years. "The results were satisfactory" MacMahon explained, "but Nick wanted to operate the machine more effectively". Producer and co-writer Allison McGourty gained access to the AT&T archive which kept the research documents for Western Electric. Within the archive they located engineers' casebooks and accounting forms that gave some more clues as to how to operate the machine. They also managed to locate 1920s photographs of the recording system being used in the Western Electric laboratory. Armed with this new information, Bergh agreed to MacMahon's plan to attempt a full recording session with twenty-three artists.

Recording process 
The Western Electric system was a live Direct-to-disc recording recording method. The earliest condenser microphone was wired into a six-foot amplifier rack comprising a preamplifier, a first level meter, a monitor amplifier, a line amplifier to drive the cutting head which etched the grooves onto a wax disc on the turntable of a Scully cutting lathe that was rotated by a pulley system and a  weight. The performers gathered around the microphone and carefully positioned themselves to achieve the correct balance. The performers were cued into when they needed to start and stop playing by a light system operated by the sound engineer that hung in the live room. The pulley allowed approximately three and a half minutes to record before the weight hit the floor. The calibration of the lathe has determined the length of the pop single to this day.

The Western Electric recording system favored small vocal-led groups, and this had a fundamental influence on them being the dominant musical aggregation to this day. The recording system does not allow for any changes to be made to the live recording.

Release 
Music from the American Epic Sessions was released on June 9, 2017, three days after the US broadcast of The American Epic Sessions. It was released in a standard and deluxe format. The standard edition contained 13 tracks, and was released as a download. The deluxe format contained 32 tracks and was released on double CD, digital download and triple vinyl. The vinyl release was launched with American Epic film screenings at Third Man Records in Detroit and Nashville. The albums sold at both these events were an exclusive white vinyl pressing.

Critical reception 
The album was released to widespread critical acclaim, with many publications praising the performances and the quality of the sound. Iain Shedden in The Australian awarded it five stars and wrote that "this double album features the highlights of those sessions and it's an exquisite representation of the primitive power of American roots music and its enduring charm – music that stirs soul." Greil Marcus in The Village Voice praised "performances so good you can hardly listen without thinking of how close each recording is to not existing at all." Andy Gill in The Independent praised "Nas's hip-hop adaptation of the Memphis Jug Band's "On The Road Again" reflecting timeless themes and vocabulary of the black experience" adding that "Alabama Shakes' terrific version of "Killer Diller Blues" is brimful of the bounce and sass."  In France, Dominique Boulay in Paris Move wrote "for this beautiful soundtrack, Nicholas Bergh is the brilliant engineer who has collected the original parts of the recording system and it is therefore thanks to him (and the artists of course) that we now have this gem!"  Ludovic Hunter-Tilney in the Financial Times noted that "New York Rapper Nas does a superb cover of the Memphis Jug Band's "On the Road Again", exposing the hip-hop blueprint within the 1928 stomper." Jerobear in Review Corner wrote that "It's impressive, and it contains enough of the antique feel to be quaint, and just enough studio engineering to sound good to modern ears. Producers T Bone Burnett and (predictably) Jack White line up a roster of stars in front of the mic to sing the old songs, and it works a treat." Keith Bruce in The Herald concluded that the album "resulted in a slew of recording sessions, far beyond what was used on the programmes, where musicians old and young responded to the challenge of one-take recording to a disc-cutting lathe operated by clock-work and pulleys, that time-limited your performance. "You feel like your soul is coming out of the speaker," says Rhiannon Giddens. She is one of the younger contributors to this wonderful double album, along with Pokey LaFarge and Nas (Nasir Jones), who is a revelation."

The album won a Grammy Award for the Alabama Shakes' performance of "Killer Diller".

Track listing

Deluxe edition CD

Disc one

Disc two

Vinyl

Side one

Side two

Side three

Side four

Side five

Side six

Standard edition digital

Performers

Groups

Alabama Shakes 
 Zac Cockrell - Bass
 Heath Fogg - Guitar
 Brittany Howard - Vocals, Guitar
 Steve Johnson - Drums
 Ben Tanner - Piano

The Americans
 Tim Carr - Steel Guitar
 Jake Faulkner - Upright Bass
 Patrick Ferris - Guitar
 Zac Sokolow - Mandolin

The Avett Brothers
 Scott Avett - Vocals, Banjo
 Seth Avett - Vocals, Acoustc guitar
 Bob Crawford - Upright Bass
 Joe Kwon - Cello

Beck
 Beck Hansen - Vocals And Guitar
 Roger Manning - Piano
 Emanuel Bennet - Vocals
 Jennifer M. Brown - Vocals
 Claire Hafteck - Vocals
 Shana May Jackson - Vocals
 Michelle Jones - Vocals
 Fred Martin - Musical Director
 Dwanna Orange - Vocals
 Tai Phillips - Vocals
 Kevin Shannon - Vocals
 Ari Sorko-Ram - Vocals
 Fawn Sorko-Ram - Vocals
 Marc Sorko-Ram - Vocals

Frank Fairfield
 Frank Fairfield - Vocals, Slide Guitar

Ana Gabriel
 Jay Bellerose - Drums
 Ana Gabriel - Vocals
 Van Dyke Parks - Accordion
 Omar Rodríguez-López - Guitar
 Gabe Witcher - Fiddle

Rhiannon Giddens
 Rhiannon Giddens - Vocals
 Hubby Jenkins - Banjo

The Hawaiians
 Dom Flemons - Guitar, Backup Vocals, Bones
 Bobby Ingano - Lap Steel
 Auntie Geri Kuhia - Vocals
 Charlie Kaleo Oyama - Vocals
 Fred Sokolow - Lap Steel

Elton John
 Elton John - Vocals, Piano

Pokey Lafarge
 Chloe Feoranzo - Clarinet
 Joseph Glynn - Upright Bass
 Adam Hoskins - Guitar
 Ryan Koenig - Percussion
 Pokey LaFarge - Vocals, Guitar
 Matthew Meyer - Drums
 TJ Muller - Cornet

Bettye LaVette
 Bettye LaVette - Vocals

Los Lobos
 David Hidalgo - Vocals, Requinto Jarocho
 Conrad Lozano - Vocals, Guitarron
 Louie Pérez - Vocals, Jarana
 Cesar Rosas - Vocals, Guitar

Lost Bayou Ramblers
 Robert Carruth - Guitar
 Eric Heigle – Drums
 André Michot - Accordion
 Louis Michot - Vocals, Fiddle

Taj Mahal
 Taj Mahal - Vocals, Ukelele

Steve Martin & Edie Brickell
 Edie Brickell - Vocals
 Steve Martin - Banjo

Ashley Monroe
 Ashley Monroe - Vocals, guitar

Nas
 Nas - Vocals

Willie Nelson and Merle Haggard
 Merle Haggard - Vocals, Guitar
 Willie Nelson - Vocals, Guitar

Jerron "Blind Boy" Paxton 
 Jerron "Blind Boy" Paxton - Vocals, Guitar

Christine Pizutti 
Christine Pizutti - Vocals, Guitar

Raphael Saadiq
 Raphael Saadiq - Vocals

Stephen Stills 
Stephen Stills - Vocals, Guitar

Jack White
 Carla Azar - Percussion
 Dominic Davis - Upright Bass
 Fats Kaplin - Mandolin
 Lillie Mae Rische - Vocals, Fiddle
 Jack White - Vocals, Guitar

Other musicians 
 Daru Jones - Drums
 Alfredo Ortiz - Drums
 Joshua Smith - Guitar

Production personnel 
 Nicholas Bergh - Engineer, transfers, mastering
 Jack White - producer
 T Bone Burnett - producer
 Bernard MacMahon - producer
 Allison McGourty- conceived by, executive producer, music supervisor
 Duke Erikson - restoration, mastering, producer
 John Polito - mastering
 Ellis Burman - mastering
 Patrick Ferris - associate producer
 Jack McLean - associate producer
 Nat Strimpopulos: artwork

References

Notes

Bibliography 
 Wald, Elijah & McGourty, Allison & MacMahon, Bernard. American Epic: The First Time America Heard Itself. New York: Touchstone, 2017. .

External links 
 
 Official American Epic website

2017 soundtrack albums
Columbia Records soundtracks
Rock soundtracks
Country music soundtracks
Folk soundtracks
Blues soundtracks
Spanish-language soundtracks
Documentary film soundtracks
Albums recorded at Electro-Vox Recording Studios
American Epic albums
LO-MAX Records albums